"Break of Dawn" is a song performed by Swedish singer Eric Saade. It is the third single from Saade's first album, Masquerade, and was first released on 28 June 2010 in Sweden.

Background
The song was written by Fredrik Kempe.

Other versions
On 12 July 2010, a remix of the song by Le Family was released in Sweden.

Chart performance

Release history

References

External links
Eric Saade Official Website

2010 singles
2010 songs
Eric Saade songs
Songs written by Fredrik Kempe
Roxy Recordings singles
Songs written by Eric Saade